Aftab Alam (born 19 April 1948) is an Indian Judge and former Justice of the Supreme Court of India.

Early life
Alam was born in 1948 in Sheikhpura district, Bihar. He studied in Patna Collegiate School.

Career 
After passing Law he was enrolled as an Advocate and practiced on Criminal, Labor and Constitutional matter in the Patna High Court. Alam was designated a Senior Advocate at the age of 36. He became Additional Standing Counsel of the Government of India in the High Court on 7 September 1981 and served up to 6 September 1985. On 27 July 1990, Alam was elevated as a permanent Judge of the Patna High Court. He was transferred to Jammu and Kashmir High Court as acting Chief Justice 6 June 2007. 

On 12 November 2007, he became the Justice of the Supreme Court of India. After the retirement on 18 April 2013, Justice Alam was appointed in the post of Chairperson of the Telecom Disputes Settlement and Appellate Tribunal. Besides his legal career, he is an eminent scholar of classical Urdu having knowledge in Persian Poetry and Sufism.

References

1948 births
Living people
People from Patna
Justices of the Supreme Court of India
Judges of the Patna High Court
Judges of the Jammu and Kashmir High Court
Chief Justices of the Jammu and Kashmir High Court
21st-century Indian lawyers
21st-century Indian judges